Farman is a surname. Notable people with the surname include:

 Georgina Farman (born 1991), English ice hockey player
 Henri Farman, Anglo-French aviator, aircraft designer, and manufacturer
 Joe Farman (1930–2013), British geophysicist
 Maurice Farman